East Devon is a local government district in Devon, England.  Its council has been based in Honiton since February 2019, and the largest town is Exmouth (with a population of 34,432 at the time of the 2011 census).

The district was formed on 1 April 1974 by the merger of the borough of Honiton with the urban districts of Budleigh Salterton, Exmouth, Ottery St. Mary, Seaton, Sidmouth along with Axminster Rural District, Honiton Rural District and part of St Thomas Rural District.

East Devon is covered by three Parliamentary constituencies, East Devon, Tiverton and Honiton and Central Devon. All were retained in the 2019 general election by the Conservative Party, were represented by Simon Jupp, Neil Parish and Mel Stride respectively until Parish’s resignation in 2022.

In the 2001 census it was found that a third of East Devon's population were over 60.  The average for England was 24%.  East Devon also had a higher number of people living in "Medical and Care Establishments" at 1.6% compared to the England average of 0.9%.

The council area covers the area of Devon furthest to east, stretching all the way from Exeter to the county border with Dorset and Somerset.

A large amount of East Devon is made up of two Areas of Outstanding Natural Beauty (AONB), East Devon AONB and the Blackdown Hills. AONBs have the same level of protection as National parks of England and Wales which restricts new developments, which protects the natural beauty of this district.

The entire East Devon coastline from Exmouth to the border with Dorset is part of the designated World Heritage Site called the Jurassic Coast; the designated area itself continues up to Old Harry Rocks near Swanage.

Politics 

From May 2019, East Devon District Council contains 60 Councillors representing 30 wards. Since the 2019 election, the majority (31/60) of the councillors do not belong to a national political party.  Most of these Independents became part of either the East Devon Alliance or the Independent Group.

In March 2020, councillors from the East Devon Alliance, Liberal Democrats, Green Party, and one Independent, formed a group called the Democratic Alliance.  Comprising 24 councillors, they became the largest group in the council.

In May 2020, eight councillors left the ruling Independent Group.  One joined the East Devon Alliance, and seven formed their own group called the Independent Progressive Group.  This new group formed a coalition partnership with the Democratic Alliance, and this coalition formed a new majority administration with 31/60 seats.

Elected Councillors

Current Groupings 

*The Democratic Alliance comprises the Liberal Democrats, Green Party, East Devon Alliance, Labour, and some independent councillors.

Transport
Exeter International Airport is located in East Devon. A small stretch of the M5 passes through the district.

Premises
In 2019 the council moved to new purpose-built offices called Blackdown House in Honiton. The building was officially opened on 27 February 2019. Prior to 2019 the council was based at Knowle, a large converted house in Sidmouth.

See also

Grade I listed buildings in East Devon
Grade II* listed buildings in East Devon
List of Sites of Special Scientific Interest in Devon

References

External links
 East Devon
 Otter Valley Weather

 
Non-metropolitan districts of Devon